{{DISPLAYTITLE:C11H13N}}
The molecular formula C11H13N (molar mass: 159.228 g/mol) may refer to:

 Pargyline
 2,3,4,5-Tetrahydro-1,5-methano-1H-3-benzazepine

Molecular formulas